UK International Salsa Congress is a Salsa Congress, organised since 2002 by Salsa UK.  The first 5 events were held at Butlins holiday camp in Bognor Regis on the South Coast of England.

The event takes place over a weekend with a showcase of international salsa talesalsa talent each evening, followed by a salsa party and after-party through the night.  During the Saturday and Sunday daytimes, International and well-respected domestic salsa instructors teach workshops at all levels from beginner to Master classes for the most advanced dancers.

Venue Change
2007 saw a change of venue to the Bournemouth International Centre (BIC) where the 6th UK International Salsa Congress was held between 12 & 14 October. There are many UK Salsa Congresses. Each has its flavour, among which is Teesside Festival UK.

References

External links
 UK International Salsa Congress
 Salsa UK

Salsa music
Music festivals in England
2002 establishments in the United Kingdom
Recurring events established in 2002